Wén and wǔ are a conceptual pair in Chinese philosophy and political culture describing opposition and complementarity of civil and military realms of government. Differentiation between wen and wu was engaged in discussions on criminal punishment, administrative control, creation and reproduction of social order, education and moral transformation.

The concept was formed during the Spring and Autumn and Warring States periods, and best articulated in the 3rd or 2nd century BCE. However, until recently it was not much discussed by the Western scholars because of their poor perception of the importance of Confucianism in the pre-imperial and early imperial era, and their understanding of Confucianism as pacifist in its nature. An example of the last is provided by John K. Fairbank: “Warfare was disesteemed in Confucianism... The resort to warfare (wu) was an admission of bankruptcy in the pursuit of wen [civility or culture]. Consequently, it should be a last resort... Herein lies the pacifist bias of the Chinese tradition... Expansion through wen... was natural and proper; whereas expansion by wu, brute force and conquest, was never to be condoned.”

History of the terms 
The posthumous names of the Zhou dynasty (1046-256 BCE) founders, King Wen and King Wu, represent the two terms as standing in the "father-and-son" relationship. Since the conquest of Shang and creation of the Zhou imperial order were the most discussed events of the classical era, the two impersonated terms had very broad currency. However, their origin is presently impossible to pinpoint.

Shuoyuan, compiled by Liu Xiang (77-6 BCE, Han dynasty), gives a classical example of the terms' balancing against each other: 

King Cheng enfeoffed Bo Qin [the Duke of Zhou's son] as the Duke of Lu. Summoning him, he addressed him, saying: "Do you know the Way of acting as the ruler over the people? ... Should you possess the civil but lack the martial, you will have no means to awe those below. Should you possess the martial but lack the civil, the people will fear you but not draw close. If the civil and martial are implemented together, then your awe-inspiring virtue will be achieved."

See also 
 Wen Wu temple

References

Bibliography 

 McNeal, Robin. Conquer and Govern: Early Chinese Military Texts from the Yi Zhou shu. Honolulu: University of Hawai'i Press, 2012.

Classical Chinese philosophy
Concepts in Chinese philosophy
Dichotomies
Political culture